Charles Edwin Heughan Hopkins (born 12 June 1987) is an English former first-class cricketer.

Hopkins was born at Peterborough and was educated at Bourne Grammar School, before going up to the University of Nottingham to study bioscience. He then undertook postgraduate studies at Jesus College, Cambridge. While at Cambridge he made his debut in first-class cricket for Cambridge MCCU against Surrey at Fenner's in 2010. He played a further first-class match in 2010 for Cambridge MCCU against Leicestershire, before making a first-class appearance in 2010 for Cambridge University against Oxford University at Oxford. He played three first-class matches while at Cambridge, scoring 34 runs and taking 2 wickets with his right-arm medium pace bowling. He gained a blue in cricket.

Hopkins played minor counties cricket for Lincolnshire, debuting against Norfolk in the 2007 Minor Counties Championship. He played minor counties cricket for Lincolnshire from 2007–2010, making five appearances in the Minor Counties Championship and two appearances in the minor counties one-day tournament.

References

External links

1987 births
Living people
People from Peterborough
People educated at Bourne Grammar School
Alumni of the University of Nottingham
Alumni of Jesus College, Cambridge
English cricketers
Lincolnshire cricketers
Cambridge MCCU cricketers
Cambridge University cricketers